David Kaufman or Kaufmann may refer to:

 David S. Kaufman (1813–1851), American politician
 David Kaufman (actor) (born 1961), American actor and voice actor
 David Kaufman (author), theater critic and author of biographies of Charles Ludlam and Doris Day
 David Kaufmann (1852–1899), Jewish-Austrian scholar
 David Kaufman (journalist), writer and journalist 
 Dziga Vertov (1896–1954), Soviet filmmaker-experimenter